Tom Trick was a Swedish rock group. Their active years were between 1979 and 1983. The band's line-up included Ulf Kjell Gür on vocals, Nisse Carlsson on guitar, Arne Arvidson on guitar, Badde Abrahamsson on bass, and Fredrik Reuterswärd on drums. Mikael Carlsson was on keyboard.

Discography
 "Suddiga profilen / Achtung" 1980, single, CBS, produced by Steve Martin 
 "Nya äventyr i tid å rum" 1980, LP 
 "Reaktioner / Rosita faller" 1981, single, CBS, produced by Mikael Rickfors 
 "Minilp" 1982, LP, WEA Metronome, produced by John Holm

References 
Ulf Kjell Gür WEA-Metrome CBS
Discogs: Tom Trick
Rockipedia: Tom Trick

Swedish rock music groups